The cinema of South Africa refers to the films and film industry of the nation of South Africa. Many foreign films have been produced about South Africa (usually involving race relations).

The first South African film to achieve international acclaim and recognition was the 1980 comedy The Gods Must Be Crazy, written, produced and directed by Jamie Uys. Set in the Kalahari, it told the story about how life in the community of Bushmen is changed when a Coke bottle, thrown out of an airplane, suddenly lands from the sky. Despite the fact that the film presented an incorrect perspective of the Khoisan san people, by framing them as a primitive society enlightened by the modernity of a falling Coke bottle. The late Jamie Uys, who wrote and directed The Gods Must Be Crazy, also had success overseas in the 1970s with his films Funny People and Funny People II, similar to the TV series Candid Camera in the United States. Leon Schuster's You Must Be Joking! films are in the same genre, and were popular among the white population of South Africa during apartheid.

Another high-profile film portraying South Africa in recent years was District 9. Directed by Neill Blomkamp, a native South African, and produced by The Lord of the Rings trilogy director Peter Jackson, the action/science-fiction film depicts a sub-class of alien refugees forced to live in the slums of Johannesburg in what many saw as a creative allegory for apartheid. The film was a critical and commercial success worldwide, and was nominated for four Academy Awards, including Best Picture, at the 82nd Academy Awards.

Silent Era

The first film studio in South Africa, Killarney Film Studios, was established in 1915 in Johannesburg by American business tycoon Isidore W. Schlesinger when he traveled to South Africa against his family's wishes after he read about the discovery of gold in Witwatersrand and was interested in exploring what he could find.

During the 1910s and 1920s, a significant amount of South African films were made in or around Durban. These films often made use of the dramatic scenery available in rural KwaZulu-Natal, particularly the Drakensberg region. KwaZulu-Natal also served as the appropriate location for historical films such as De Voortrekkers (1916) and The Symbol of Sacrifice (1918). American filmmaker Lorimer Johnston directed several films in the area in the late 1910s which starred American actresses Edna Flugrath and Caroline Frances Cooke. Despite the participation of Johnson, Flugrath and Cooke, these were South African productions featuring local actors and stories.

Sound Era
Sarie Marais, the first Afrikaans-language sound film, was released in 1931. Subsequent sound releases such as Die Wildsboudjie (1948), a 1949 Sarie Marais remake, and Daar doer in die bosveld (1950) continued to cater primarily to white, Afrikaans-speaking audiences.

The 1950s saw an increased use of South African locations and talent by international filmmakers. British co-productions like Coast of Skeletons (1956) and American co-productions like The Cape Town Affair (1967) reflected a growing trend of shooting in real locations, rather than using backlots.

International Productions

From 2009, there was an increased use of South African locations and talent by international film studios. US productions like District 9 (2009), Chronicle (2012), Avengers: Age of Ultron (2015), The Dark Tower (2017), Tomb Raider (2018), The Kissing Booth (2018), Maze Runner: The Death Cure (2018), Escape Room (2019) and Bloodshot (2020) reflect a growing trend by large international houses to use Cape Town, Johannesburg and other South African locations for their film productions.

The 3 major South African film distributors

Listed alongside each distributor are the studios they represent:

Times Media Films: 20th Century Studios, Warner Bros., New Line Cinema, DreamWorks Pictures, DreamWorks Animation.
Ster-Kinekor: Walt Disney Pictures, Sony Pictures
United International Pictures: Universal Pictures, Paramount Pictures, VideoVision Entertainment

See also
 List of South African films
 Media of South Africa
 Cinema of the world
 World cinema
 African cinema
South African Film and Television Awards

References

Further reading 

 Botha, Martin. South African Cinema 1896-2010 . Bristol: Intellect, 2012
 Blignaut, Johan, and Botha, Martin. Movies, Moguls, Mavericks : South African Cinema, 1979-1991 . Cape Town: Showdata, 1992
 Maingard, Jacqueline. South African National Cinema . London ;: Routledge, 2007.
 Tomaselli, Keyan G. Encountering Modernity : Twentieth Century South African Cinemas . Amsterdam: Rozenberg, 2006
 Balseiro, Isabel., and Ntongela. Masilela. To Change Reels : Film and Culture in South Africa . Detroit, Mich: Wayne State University Press, 2003
 Modisane, Litheko. South Africa’s Renegade Reels : the Making and Public Lives of Black-Centered Films . 1st ed. New York: Palgrave Macmillan, 2013
 Tomaselli, Keyan G. The Cinema of Apartheid : Race and Class in South African Film . London: Routledge, 1989.

External links

The Latest News, Job Offers and Opportunities in the South African Film Industry
South African movie website
South Africa's film industry Focus on the industry – SouthAfrica.info
 African Media Program. Comprehensive database of African media
Timeline: 1895–2003 A History of the South African Film Industry
The South African Movie Database Showcasing the South African industry
The Callsheet Newspaper Monthly South African film industry trade publication